Langdorf is a municipality in the district of Regen in Bavaria in Germany. It was formerly known as Dorfmuri.

References

External links
 Town of Langdorf

Regen (district)